Sándor Sebők (29 April 1898 – August 1952) was a sailor from Hungary, who represented his country at the 1928 Summer Olympics in Amsterdam, Netherlands.

References 

Sailors at the 1928 Summer Olympics – 6 Metre
Olympic sailors of Hungary
Hungarian male sailors (sport)
1898 births
1952 deaths